Computer Chess is a 2013 independent comedy-drama film written and directed by Andrew Bujalski. The film premiered at the 2013 Sundance Film Festival, where it won the Alfred P. Sloan Feature Film Prize, and subsequently screened at such festivals as South by Southwest and the Maryland Film Festival.

It is Bujalski's second black-and-white film, and was shot with analog videocameras. It is more improvisatory than his previous films, with only an eight-page treatment for a script. Bujalski also cast nonprofessional actors who were knowledgeable in computer technology.

Plot summary
In 1980, an annual gathering of teams of idiosyncratic nerds compete in a nondescript California hotel to see which of their computer programs can best the others at computer chess. A grandmaster (Gerald Peary) presides as master of ceremonies with a videographer and microphone in tow. Clunky, primitive personal computers are carted from room to room. Bad haircuts, dorky shirts, "birth control glasses", and other social impedimenta are ubiquitous. Bull sessions on the dystopian possibilities of artificial intelligence are pursued. The Pentagon's interest in the goings-on is intimated. The only female geek (Robin Schwartz) in attendance is repeatedly hailed and “welcomed” by the MC.

Simultaneously at the same hotel, a human potential movement group (the “seekers”) has occasional run-ins with the geeks, generating awkward and humorous moments. A painfully shy young computer programmer (Patrick Riester) attracts the interest of a swinging older couple (Cyndi Williams and Chris Doubek). The twin threads of “spiritual” exploration and cybernetic innovation imply an unspoken and implicit hidden connection. In a startling scene, a prostitute — apparently solicited by the young programmer — reveals herself to be infinitely more than expected.

Cast
Patrick Riester as Peter Bishton
Wiley Wiggins as Martin Beuscher
Myles Paige as Michael Papageorge
Robin Schwartz as Shelly Flintic
Gerald Peary as Pat Henderson
Gordon Kindlmann as Tom Schoesser

Reception
The movie has an approval rating of 88% on Rotten Tomatoes, with an average rating of 7.5/10. The site's critics' consensus reads: "With its delightfully retro production design, Computer Chess is an inventive, intelligent, and humorous comedy that celebrates the eccentricity and uniqueness of its subject." In The Village Voice, Aaron Hillis wrote that it was "the funniest, headiest, most playfully eccentric American indie of the year." Mike D'Angelo of The A.V. Club raved that the film was "the year’s most singular and adventurous movie to date, to the point where it feels not so much original—a word that conveys a strong sense of craft—as it does “isolated,” as in a mutant strain of a virus. What's more, it's fun, generating pleasure not from canned jokes or clichéd plot twists but simply from a sense of unhindered freedom."

References

External links
 
 
 
Interview with the director at Motherboard

2013 films
2013 in chess
2013 comedy-drama films
Alfred P. Sloan Prize winners
American independent films
American black-and-white films
Films about chess
Films about computing
Films set in 1980
Films shot in Austin, Texas
Sundance Film Festival award winners
2013 independent films
2010s English-language films
2010s American films